Dikwillem (Afrikaans) or Dicker Wilhelm (German), also known as  Garub-Berg or Garubberg, is a mountain in Namibia. With an elevation of 1496 meters and lying within the Namib desert, the mountain is visible from a great distance from all directions. It is about 15 kilometers north of the National Road B4 and about 80 kilometers east of Lüderitz.

The harsh environment and barren plains around Garub became habitat of the desert horses of the Namib. They are said to be descendants from German cavalry horses and adapted to the conditions and dry climate of the desert.

During the time of German colonial empire a heliographic station was operated by the German Schutztruppe on top of Dikwillem.

Gallery

References 

Geography of ǁKaras Region
Mountains of Namibia